The Soviet–Japanese border conflicts, also known as the Soviet-Japanese Border War or the First Soviet-Japanese War, was a series of minor and major conflicts fought between the Soviet Union (led by Joseph Stalin), Mongolia (led by Khorloogiin Choibalsan) and Japan (led by Hirohito) in Northeast Asia from 1932 to 1939.

The Japanese expansion in Northeast China created a common border between the Japanese occupied ground and Soviet Far East. This led to growing tensions with the Soviet Union, with both sides often violating the border and accusing each other of border violations. The Soviets and Japanese, including their respective client states of Mongolia and Manchukuo, fought in a series of escalating small border skirmishes and punitive expeditions from 1935 until Soviet-Mongolian victory over the Japanese in the Battles of Khalkhin Gol in 1939 which resolved the dispute and returned the borders to status quo ante bellum.

The Soviet–Japanese border conflicts heavily contributed to the signing of the Soviet–Japanese Neutrality Pact in 1941.

Prelude from 1904-1932 

The Russo-Japanese War of 1904-1905 was just prior to World War 1 starting in 1914 when the Empire of Japan (led by Emperor Meiji) and the Russian Empire (led by Tsar Nicholas II) resulted the,Russian Army,and the Navy defeated by the Japanese Army and Japanese Navy in 1905 following the aftermath of the First Sino-Japanese War and the Boxer Rebellion against Empress Dowager Cixi . Following the 1918 Siberian intervention by Japan in the Russian Civil War (during/after : World War 1) in the Russian Far East (later ; the Soviet-Russian Far East) and fighting against Vladimir Lenin and the Soviet Bolshevik Communists from 1918-1922 after the Japanese took the German Qingdao Colony and the German Marshall Island Colonies from the German Empire (led by Kaiser wilhelm ii) in 1914 during WW1 . In 1922 after they captured Vladivostok in 1918 to stop the Bolsheviks in the Russian Far East during the Civil War the Japanese have to retreat and withdraw back to Japan because the Bolsheviks led by Lenin were to powerful . From 1918-1920 the Imperial Japanese Army (commanded by Emperor Taishō after Meiji died in 1912) were helping the White Army and Alexander Kerensky against the Bolshevik Red Army and also helped the Czechoslovak Legion in Siberia to get back to Europe when a Armoured Train from Austria-Hungary in Europe got lost in Siberia in Russia in 1918 . And between 1918 and 1920 the Japanese helped the Czechoslovak Legion back to Europe in 1920 but when Czechoslovaks returned to Europe Austria-Hungary had already collapsed and Czechoslovakia was created in 1918 two years before the Czechoslovak Legion returned while Japan withdraw from the Russian Revolution and the Civil War in 1922 . However following the Soviet intervention in Mongolia of 1921 the Republic of China have to withdraw from Outer Mongolia in 1921 following its previous occupation in 1919 . Following Hirohito’s Japanese invasion of Manchuria in 1931-1932, (after Taisho’s death in 1926) violations of the borders between Manchukuo, the Mongolian People's Republic and the Soviet Union took place frequently. Many of them were misunderstandings due to insufficiently marked nature of the border, but some were intentional acts of espionage. Between 1932 and 1934, according to the Imperial Japanese Army, 152 border disputes occurred, largely because the Soviets infilitrated Manchuria for intelligence purposes. The Soviets blamed the Japanese for 15 cases of border violation, 6 air intrusions, and 20 episodes of "spy smuggling" in 1933 alone. Hundreds of other violations were reported by both sides throughout the following years. To make matters worse, Soviet-Japanese diplomacy and trust had declined even further, with the Japanese being openly called "fascist enemies" at the Seventh Comintern Congress in July 1935.

Minor clashes

1935 Incidents 

In early 1935 around January or February , the first shooting affray took place. From then until April 1939, the Imperial Japanese Army recorded 108 such incidents. Several dozen cavalrymen of the Mongolian People's Army trespassed in Manchuria near some disputed fishing grounds, and engaged an 11-man Manchukuo Imperial Army patrol unit near the Buddhist temple at Halhamiao, which was led by a Japanese military advisor. The Manchukuo Army incurred slight casualties, suffering 6 wounded and 2 dead, including the Japanese officer. The Mongols suffered no casualties, and withdrew when the Japanese sent a punitive expedition to reclaim the disputed area. Two motorized cavalry companies, a machine gun company, and a tankette platoon were sent and occupied the point for three weeks without resistance.

In June 1935, the Japanese and Soviets directly exchanged fire for the first time when an 11-man Japanese patrol west of Lake Khanka was attacked by 6 Soviet horsemen, supposedly inside Manchukuoan territory. In the ensuring firefight, one Soviet soldier was killed, and two horses were captured. While the Japanese asked the Soviets for a joint investigation of the issue, the Soviets rejected the request.

In October 1935, 9 Japanese and 32 Manchukuoan border guards were engaged in setting up a post, about 20 kilometers north of Suifenho, when they were attacked by a force of 50 Soviet soldiers. The Soviets opened fire on them with rifles and 5 heavy machine guns. In the ensuing clash, 2 Japanese and 4 Manchukuoan soldiers were killed, and another 5 were wounded. The Manchukuoan foreign affairs representative lodged a verbal protest with the Soviet consul at Suifenho. The Imperial Japanese Army's Kwantung Army also sent an intelligence officer to investigate the scene of the clash.

On 19 December 1935, a Manchukuoan army unit engaging in a reconnoitering project southwest of Buir Lake clashed with a Mongolian party, reportedly capturing 10 soldiers. Five days later, 60 truck-borne Mongolian troops assaulted the Manchukuoans and were repulsed, at the cost of 3 Manchukuoan dead. The same day, at Brunders, Mongolian soldiers attempted to drive out Manchukuoan forces three times in the day, and then again at a night, but all attempts failed. More small attempts to dislodge the Manchukuoans from their outposts occurred in January, with the Mongolians this time utilizing airplanes for recon duty. Due to the arrival of a small force of Japanese troops in three trucks, these attempts also failed with a few casualties on both sides. Aside from the 10 prisoners taken, Mongolian casualties during these clashes are unknown.

1936 border incidents 

In February 1936, Lieutenant-Colonel Sugimoto Yasuo was ordered to form a detachment from the 14th Cavalry Regiment and, in the words of Lieutenant-General Kasai Heijuro, "out the Outer Mongol intruders from the Olankhuduk region". Sugimoto's detachment included cavalry guns, heavy machine guns, and tankettes. Arrayed against him were 140 Mongolians, equipped with heavy machine guns and light artillery. On February 12, Sugimoto's men successfully drove the Mongolians south, at the cost of 8 men killed, 4 men wounded, and 1 tankette destroyed. After this, they began to withdraw, but were attacked by 5-6 Mongolian armored cars and 2 bombers, which briefly wreaked havoc on a Japanese column. This was rectified when the unit obtained artillery support, enabling it to destroy or drive off the armored cars.

In this battle, both the Japanese Army and Mongolian Army used a small number of armored fighting vehicles and military aircraft. The Tauran incident of March 1936 occurred as the result of 100 Mongolian and 6 Soviet troops attacking and occupying the disputed village of Tauran, Mongolia, driving off the small Manchurian garrison in the process. They were supported by a handful of light bombers and armored cars, though their bombing sorties failed to inflict any damage on the Japanese, and three of them were shot down by Japanese heavy machine guns. Local Japanese forces counter-attacked, running dozens of bombing sorties on the village, and eventually assaulting it with 400 men and 10 tankettes. The result was a Mongolian rout, with 56 soldiers being killed, including 3 Soviet advisors, and an unknown number being wounded. Japanese losses amounted to 27 killed and 9 wounded.

Later in March 1936, there was another border clash, this time between the Japanese and the Soviets. Reports of border violations led the Japanese Korean Army to send ten men by truck to investigate, but this party itself was ambushed by 20 Soviet NKVD soldiers deployed at a point 300 meters inside the territory claimed by the Japanese. After incurring several casualties, the Japanese patrol withdrew, and brought up 100 men within hours as reinforcements, who then drove off the Soviets. However, fighting erupted later in the day when the NKVD also brought reinforcements. By nightfall, the fighting had stopped and both sides had pulled back. The Soviets agreed to return the bodies of two Japanese soldiers who died in the fighting, which was seen as encouraging by the Japanese government.

In early April 1936, three Japanese soldiers were killed near Suifenho, in one of many minor and barely documented affrays. However, this incident was notable in that the Soviets again returned the bodies of the dead servicemen.

1937

Kanchazu Island incident 

Three Soviet gunboats crossed the center line of the river, unloaded troops, and occupied Kanchazu (also spelled "Kanchatzu") island. Soldiers from the IJA 1st Division, using two horse-drawn 37mm artillery pieces, proceeded to hastily set up improvised firing sites, and load their guns with both high-explosive and armor-piercing shells. They shelled the Soviets, sinking the lead gunboat, crippling the second, and driving off the third. Japanese troops then fired on the swimming crewmen of the sunken ships with machine guns. 37 Soviet soldiers were killed in this incident; the Japanese forces suffered no casualties. The Japanese Ministry of Foreign Affairs protested and demanded the Soviet soldiers withdraw from the island. The Soviet leadership, apparently shocked by the display and not wanting things to escalate, agreed and evacuated their forces.

Soviet involvement in China 1937-1941 

In July 1937, the Japanese invaded China, starting the Second Sino-Japanese War. Soviet-Japanese relations were chilled by the invasion and Mikhail Kalinin, the Soviet head of state, told the American ambassador in Moscow that same month that his country was prepared for an attack by Nazi Germany in the west and Japan in the east. During the first two years of the war, the Soviets heavily aided the Chinese, increasing tension with Japan. From October 1937 to September 1939, the Soviets supplied the Chinese with 82 tanks, over 1,300 pieces of artillery, over 14,000 machine guns, 50,000 rifles, 1,550 trucks and tractors, and also ammunition, equipment and supplies. They also provided 3,665 military advisors and volunteers as part of the Soviet Volunteer Group. 195 of these men, almost all officers, died in battle against Japanese forces. Large-scale aid ceased by the end of the Soviet–Japanese border conflicts.

Battle of Lake Khasan 

The Battle of Lake Khasan (July 29, 1938 – August 11, 1938), also known as the "Changkufeng Incident" (Japanese pronunciation: Chōkohō Jiken) in China and Japan, was an attempted military incursion from Manchukuo (by the Japanese) into territory claimed by the Soviet Union. This incursion was founded in the belief of the Japanese side that the Soviet Union misinterpreted the demarcation of the boundary based on the Convention of Peking treaty between the former Imperial Russia and Qing dynasty of China (and subsequent supplementary agreements on demarcation), and furthermore, that the demarcation markers had been tampered with. The Japanese 19th Division expelled a Soviet garrison from the disputed area, and repulsed numerous counterattacks by an overwhelmingly more numerous and heavily armed Soviet force. Both sides took heavy losses, though Soviet casualties were nearly three times higher than Japanese casualties, and they lost dozens of tanks. The conflict was resolved diplomatically on August 10, when the Japanese ambassador in Moscow asked for peace. The Japanese troops withdrew the next day, and the Soviets re-occupied the area.

Major Serious conflicts of 1939 

The conflict between the Soviet Union and Japan in 1939 is referred to by some historians as the "Forgotten Soviet-Japanese War."  It had a lasting and significant impact on Japanese strategic decisions in World War II.

Battles of Khalkhin Gol 

The Battle of Khalkhin Gol, sometimes spelled Halhin Gol or Khalkin Gol after the Halha River passing through the battlefield and known in Japan as the Nomonhan Incident (after a nearby village on the border between Mongolia and Manchuria), was the decisive battle of the undeclared Soviet–Japanese Border War. After skirmishes in May and June 1939, engagements with corps-sized forces took place, though the Soviets were again far more numerous and more heavily armed than the Japanese. There were three principal engagements:

 The initial Japanese attack in July (July 2–25), intended to wipe out the materially and numerically superior Soviets. The Soviets suffered very heavy losses compared to the Japanese and minor gains were made by the Japanese, but stubborn resistance and an armored counter-blow stalled the Japanese attack. It drifted into a stalemate with skirmishing.

 The failed Soviet probing attacks in early August (August 7/8 and August 20) which were thrown back with no gains and considerable casualties. In the intermediate period between these three phases, the Soviets built up their forces, while the Japanese were forbidden from doing so for fear of escalating the conflict.

 The successful Soviet counteroffensive in late August at Nomonhan with a fully built-up force that encircled the remains of the 23rd Division and by August 31 had destroyed all Japanese forces on the Soviet side of the river.

In this engagement the Soviets and Mongolians defeated the Japanese, and expelled them from Mongolia. The Soviet Union and Japan agreed to a cease-fire on 15 September, which took effect the following day. Free from a threat in the Soviet Far East, Stalin proceeded with the Soviet invasion of Poland on 17 September.

Soviet–Japanese Neutrality Pact of 1941-1945 

After the Japanese defeat at Khalkhin Gol, Japan and the Soviet Union signed the Soviet–Japanese Neutrality Pact on 13 April 1941, which was similar to the Molotov–Ribbentrop Pact between the Germans and the Soviet Union of August 1939. Later in 1941, Japan considered breaking the pact when Nazi Germany invaded the Soviet Union in Operation Barbarossa but they made the crucial decision to keep it and to continue to press into Southeast Asia instead after the Japanese  Attacked on Pearl Harbor . This was said to be largely due to the Battle of Khalkhin Gol. The defeat there caused Japan not to join forces with Germany against the Soviet Union, even though Japan and Germany were part of the Tripartite Pact. On April 5, 1945, the Soviet Union unilaterally denounced the neutrality pact, noting that it would not renew the treaty when it expired on April 13, 1946. Four months later, prior to the expiration of the neutrality pact and between the atomic bombings of Hiroshima and Nagasaki, the Soviet Union declared war on Japan, completely surprising the Japanese. The Soviet invasion of Manchuria was launched in 1945 one hour after the declaration of war on Japan .

Portrayal in media/movies 

The fighting early in World War II between Japan and the Soviet Union plays a key part in the South Korean film My Way, in which Japanese soldiers (including Koreans in Japanese service) fight and are captured by the Soviets and forced to fight for them.

1939-Present Day Nuclear Age since 1945 
Today the Soviet-Japanese Wars are largely forgotten, although they directed resulted in the Soviet invasions of Manchuria and northern Korea and the division of Korea between the present day ROK (South Korea) and the DPRK (North Korea) . 
 Chinese Eastern Railway and the South Manchuria Railway
 Kantokuen
 Mongolia in World War II
 Russo-Japanese War
 Sino-Soviet conflict (1929)
 Soviet Invasion of Xinjiang
 Soviet–Japanese War

Citations

General bibliography 

 
 

 
1930s conflicts
1930s in Japan
1930s in Mongolia
1930s in the Soviet Union
20th-century military history of Japan
Battles involving Mongolia
Borders of the Soviet Union
History of Manchuria
Japan–Soviet Union relations
Military history of Japan during World War II
Military history of Mongolia
Military of Mongolia
Pacific theatre of World War II
Wars involving Japan
Wars involving Manchukuo
Wars involving Mongolia
Wars involving the Soviet Union